Westward Whoa is a 1936 animated short film in the Looney Tunes series. It marks the final appearances of spotted St. Bernard puppies Ham and Ex, Beans and Little Kitty. It is also the last cartoon where Porky Pig is the co-star to Beans. The film is a Western adaptation of the ancient fable "The Boy Who Cried Wolf."

The film is in the public domain after Warner Bros. failed to renew the copyright in 1964.

Plot
Beans and his companions are travelling and exploring in a wagon train. At the front, Beans plays an accordion, and Little Kitty strums a banjo. The two also sing while the rest harmonize. Soon the travellers set up camp in the woods and enjoy their night.

Ham and Ex sneak out to explore a bit, but then they notice some feathers around a boulder and raise an alarm of Native Americans. When Beans shoots at the feathers it is revealed to be a turkey. Ham and Ex of course knew that and Beans warns them not to create any more false alarms.

Just to spice up their little adventure and to entertain themselves, Ham and Ex perform the Indian charge call. This raises another alarm, so Ham and Ex hide in the woods and stumble into an actual Native. The Native gives chase, but the pups escape and head back to camp to warn everyone. No one believes and this is another of their pranks. Ham and Ex then hide themselves in a chest. Shortly the whole Native tribe arrives, alerting the camp. The explorers manage to counter the invasion, while Ham and Ex get nabbed by one of the Natives. Beans rescues them by tossing a foothold trap at their captive. As the pups watch Beans he plays a little prank on them with a holler call, scaring them into chest.

References

External links
 

1936 short films
1936 animated films
1930s American animated films
1930s Western (genre) comedy films
American black-and-white films
Western (genre) animated films
Films scored by Norman Spencer (composer)
Films about Native Americans
Films directed by Jack King
Looney Tunes shorts
American Western (genre) comedy films
Beans the Cat films
Porky Pig films
Animated films about cats
Films about pigs
Animated films about dogs
1936 comedy films
1930s English-language films